Konrad Fünfstück (born 7 October 1980) is a German football manager and former player. He manages Werder Bremen's reserves.

His first major role was the job as the first team manager of 1. FC Kaiserslautern. He held this role from September 2015 when he replaced Kosta Runjaic until he was released in May 2016. He next managed Swiss Super League side FC Wil.

Managerial career

Early career
Initially, Fünfstück worked at VfB Pößneck having ended his playing career due to injury. At Pößneck, he was the kids team manager. In July 2002, he left VfB Pößneck to join SpVgg Greuther Fürth as the youth team manager. He stayed as the manager until 2006, when he became Fürth's youth director. Albeit taking charge of the youth team once more in 2010, Fünfstück remained in this post until June 2011, when he once again moved upstairs to become the new manager of SpVgg Greuther Fürth II.

This was the post he remained in until the end of 2012. During his time with Fürth II, they played in the Regionalliga Bayern.

1. FC Kaiserslautern
Fünfstück left Greuther Fürth to join 1.FC Kaiserslautern, where he would become their reserve team manager and head of youth development. When Kosta Runjaic left the club in September 2015, Fünfstück was announced the new first team manager. His first game in charge was a 2-1 away win over VfL Bochum. By the end of the 2015–16 season Fünfstück was released from his contract.

FC Wil
In June 2017 he was named new manager of Swiss club FC Wil.

Werder Bremen
In May 2019, it was announced Fünfstück would manage Werder Bremen's reserves in the 2019–20 season.

References

External links
 

Living people
1980 births
Sportspeople from Bayreuth
German football managers
1. FC Kaiserslautern managers
SV Werder Bremen II managers
2. Bundesliga managers